A bean is the seed of several plants in the family Fabaceae, which are used as vegetables for human or animal food. They can be cooked in many different ways, including boiling, frying, and baking, and are used in many traditional dishes throughout the world.

Terminology 
The word "bean" and its Germanic cognates (e.g. German Bohne) have existed in common use in West Germanic languages since before the 12th century, referring to broad beans, chickpeas, and other pod-borne seeds. This was long before the New World genus Phaseolus was known in Europe. After Columbian-era contact between Europe and the Americas, use of the word was extended to pod-borne seeds of Phaseolus, such as the common bean and the runner bean, and the related genus Vigna. The term has long been applied generally to many other seeds of similar form, such as Old World soybeans, peas, other vetches, and lupins, and even to those with slighter resemblances, such as coffee beans, vanilla beans, castor beans, and cocoa beans. Thus the term "bean" in general usage can refer to a host of different species.

Seeds called "beans" are often included among the crops called "pulses" (legumes), although the words are not always interchangeable (usage varies by plant variety and by region). Both terms, beans and pulses, are usually reserved for grain crops and thus exclude those legumes that have tiny seeds and are used exclusively for non-grain purposes (forage, hay, and silage), such as clover and alfalfa. The United Nations Food and Agriculture Organization defines "BEANS, DRY" (item code 176) as applicable only to species of Phaseolus. This is one of various examples of how narrower word senses enforced in trade regulations or botany often coexist in natural language with broader senses in culinary use and general use; other common examples are the narrow sense of the word nut and the broader sense of the word nut, and the fact that tomatoes are fruit, botanically speaking, but are often treated as vegetables in culinary and general usage. Relatedly, another detail of usage is that several species of plants that are sometimes called beans, including Vigna angularis (azuki bean), mungo (black gram), radiata (green gram), and aconitifolia (moth bean), were once classified as Phaseolus but later reclassified—but the taxonomic revision does not entirely stop the use of well-established senses in general usage.

Cultivation

Unlike the closely related pea, beans are a summer crop that needs warm temperatures to grow. Legumes are capable of nitrogen fixation and hence need less fertiliser than most plants. Maturity is typically 55–60 days from planting to harvest. As the bean pods mature, they turn yellow and dry up, and the beans inside change from green to their mature colour. As a vine, bean plants need external support, which may take the form of special "bean cages" or poles. Native Americans customarily grew them along with corn and squash (the so-called Three Sisters), with the tall cornstalks acting as support for the beans.

In more recent times, the so-called "bush bean" has been developed which does not require support and has all its pods develop simultaneously (as opposed to pole beans which develop gradually). This makes the bush bean more practical for commercial production.

History

Beans were an important source of protein throughout Old and New World history, and still are today.

Beans are one of the longest-cultivated plants in history. Broad beans, also called fava beans, are in their wild state the size of a small fingernail, and were first gathered in Afghanistan and the Himalayan foothills. An early cultivated form were grown in Thailand from the early seventh millennium BCE, predating ceramics. Beans were deposited with the dead in ancient Egypt. Not until the second millennium BCE did cultivated, large-seeded broad beans appear in the Aegean region, Iberia, and transalpine Europe. In the Iliad (8th century BCE), there is a passing mention of beans and chickpeas cast on the threshing floor.

The oldest-known domesticated beans in the Americas were found in Guitarrero Cave, an archaeological site in Peru, and dated to around the second millennium BCE. However, genetic analyses of the common bean Phaseolus show that it originated in Mesoamerica, and subsequently spread southward, along with maize and squash, traditional companion crops.

Most of the kinds of beans commonly eaten today are part of the genus Phaseolus, which originated in the Americas.  The first European to encounter them was Christopher Columbus, while exploring what may have been the Bahamas, and saw them growing in fields. Five kinds of Phaseolus beans were domesticated by pre-Columbian peoples: common beans (P. vulgaris) grown from Chile to the northern part of what is now the United States; and lima and sieva beans (P. lunatus); as well as the less widely distributed teparies (P. acutifolius), scarlet runner beans (P. coccineus), and polyanthus beans.

One well-documented use of beans by pre-Columbian people as far north as the Atlantic seaboard is the "Three Sisters" method of companion plant cultivation: Many tribes would grow beans together with maize (corn), and squash. The corn would not be planted in rows as is done by European agriculture, but in a checkerboard/hex fashion across a field, in separate patches of one to six stalks each.
Beans would be planted around the base of the developing stalks, and would vine their way up as the stalks grew. All American beans at that time were vine plants; "bush beans" were cultivated more recently. The cornstalks would work as a trellis for the bean plants, and the beans would provide much-needed nitrogen for the corn. Squash would be planted in the spaces between the patches of corn in the field. They would be provided slight shelter from the sun by the corn, would shade the soil and reduce evaporation, and would deter many animals from attacking the corn and beans because their coarse, hairy vines and broad, stiff leaves are difficult or uncomfortable for animals such as deer and raccoons to walk through, crows to land on, and are a deterrent to other animals as well.

Beans were cultivated across Chile in Pre-Hispanic times, likely as far south as Chiloé Archipelago.

Dry beans come from both Old World varieties of broad beans (fava beans) and New World varieties (kidney, black, cranberry, pinto, navy/haricot).

Common genera and species 

Currently, the world gene banks hold about 40,000 bean varieties, although only a fraction are mass-produced for regular consumption.

Most of the foods we call "beans", "legumes", "lentils" and "pulses" belong to the same family, Fabaceae ("leguminous" plants), but are from different genera and species, native to different homelands and distributed worldwide depending on their adaptability. Many varieties are eaten both fresh (the whole pod, and the immature beans may or may not be inside) or shelled (immature seeds, mature and fresh seeds, or mature and dried seeds). Numerous legumes look similar, and have become naturalized in locations across the world, which often lead to similar names for different species.

Properties

Nutrition

Raw green beans are 90% water, 7% carbohydrates, 2% protein, and contain negligble fat (table). In a  reference serving, raw green beans supply 31 calories of food energy, and are a moderate source (10-19% of the Daily Value, DV) of vitamin C (15% DV) and vitamin B6 (11% DV), with no other micronutrients in significant content (table).

Antinutrients
Many types of bean like kidney bean contain significant amounts of antinutrients that inhibit some enzyme processes in the body. Phytic acid and phytates, present in grains, nuts, seeds and beans, interfere with bone growth and interrupt vitamin D metabolism. Pioneering work on the effect of phytic acid was done by Edward Mellanby from 1939.

Health concerns

Toxins

Some kinds of raw beans contain a harmful, tasteless toxin: the lectin phytohaemagglutinin, which must be removed by cooking. Red kidney beans are particularly toxic, but other types also pose risks of food poisoning. Many types of beans contain lectins, and kidney beans have the highest concentrations – especially red kidney beans. As few as 4 or 5 raw beans can cause severe stomachache, vomiting and diarrhoea. A recommended method is to boil the beans for at least ten minutes; under-cooked beans may be more toxic than raw beans.

Cooking beans, without bringing them to a boil, in a slow cooker at a temperature well below boiling may not destroy toxins. A case of poisoning by butter beans used to make falafel was reported; the beans were used instead of traditional broad beans or chickpeas, soaked and ground without boiling, made into patties, and shallow fried.

Bean poisoning is not well known in the medical community, and many cases may be misdiagnosed or never reported; figures appear not to be available. In the case of the UK National Poisons Information Service, available only to health professionals, the dangers of beans other than red beans were not flagged .

Fermentation is used in some parts of Africa to improve the nutritional value of beans by removing toxins. Inexpensive fermentation improves the nutritional impact of flour from dry beans and improves digestibility, according to research co-authored by Emire Shimelis, from the Food Engineering Program at Addis Ababa University. Beans are a major source of dietary protein in Kenya, Malawi, Tanzania, Uganda and Zambia.

Bacterial infection from bean sprouts
It is common to make beansprouts by letting some types of bean, often mung beans, germinate in moist and warm conditions; beansprouts may be used as ingredients in cooked dishes, or eaten raw or lightly cooked. There have been many outbreaks of disease from bacterial contamination, often by salmonella, listeria, and Escherichia coli,  of beansprouts not thoroughly cooked, some causing significant mortality.

Flatulence

Many edible beans, including broad beans, navy beans, kidney beans and soybeans, contain oligosaccharides (particularly raffinose and stachyose), a type of sugar molecule also found in cabbage. An anti-oligosaccharide enzyme is necessary to properly digest these sugar molecules. As a normal human digestive tract does not contain any anti-oligosaccharide enzymes, consumed oligosaccharides are typically digested by bacteria in the large intestine. This digestion process produces gases, such as methane as a byproduct, which are then released as flatulence.

Production

The production data for legumes are published by FAO in three categories:
 Pulses dry: all mature and dry seeds of leguminous plants except soybeans and groundnuts.
 Oil crops: soybeans and groundnuts.
 Fresh vegetable: immature green fresh fruits of leguminous plants.

The following is a summary of FAO data.

Main crops of "Pulses, Total (dry)" are "Beans, dry [176]" 26.83 million tons, "Peas, dry [187]" 14.36 million tons, "Chick peas [191]" 12.09 million tons, "Cow peas [195]" 6.99 million tons, "Lentils [201]" 6.32 million tons, "Pigeon peas [197]" 4.49 million tons, "Broad beans, horse beans [181]" 4.46 million tons. In general, the consumption of pulses per capita has been decreasing since 1961. Exceptions are lentils and cowpeas.

The world leader in production of dry beans (Phaseolus spp), is India, followed by Myanmar (Burma) and Brazil. In Africa, the most important producer is Tanzania.

No symbol = official figure, P = official figure, F = FAO estimate, * = unofficial/semi-official/mirror data, C = calculated figure A = aggregate (may include official, semi-official or estimates)

Source: UN Food and Agriculture Organization (FAO)

See also

 Baked beans
 Jelly beans
 Mexican jumping bean
 List of bean soups
 Fassoulada – a bean soup
 List of edible seeds
 List of legume dishes

References

Bibliography

External links

 Everett H. Bickley Collection, 1919–1980 Archives Center, National Museum of American History, Smithsonian Institution.
 Discovery Online: The Skinny On Why Beans Give You Gas
 Fermentation improves nutritional value of beans
 Cook's Thesaurus on Beans

Edible legumes
Pod vegetables
Staple foods
Vegan cuisine
Vegetarian cuisine
Crops
Plant common names